This is a list of episodes of the  television series. The episodes were written by Kenichi Kanemaki with Hiroyuki Kawasaki and Satoru Nishizono and the series was directed by Kōichi Mashimo and produced by Bee Train animation studio.  The opening theme is "Hikari no Yukue" by savage genius while the ending theme is "romanesque" by FictionJunction Yuuka.

Episode list

References

External links
 Official El Cazador de la Bruja website 
 TV Tokyo's official El Cazador de la Bruja website 

El Cazador de la Bruja